The Ulster Society for the Prevention of Cruelty to Animals (USPCA) is an animal charity based and operating in Northern Ireland. The other SPCA societies operating in the United Kingdom are the Royal Society for the Prevention of Cruelty to Animals (RSPCA) and the Scottish Society for the Prevention of Cruelty to Animals (SSPCA).

The USPCA is a registered charity and is the primary animal care group in Northern Ireland. After the RSPCA, the USPCA is the oldest animal welfare organisation in the world, having been founded in 1836.

According to its website, the organisation's views are:

Its remit is the promotion of the welfare of all animals "through education and enforcement". The organisation is small however, having only four officers to cater for the whole of Northern Ireland.

See also 
 Animal welfare in the United Kingdom
 Irish Society for Prevention of Cruelty to Animals, active in the Republic of Ireland

References

External links
 USPCA website

Animal welfare organisations based in the United Kingdom
Charities based in Northern Ireland
Animal charities based in the United Kingdom
Organizations established in 1836
1836 establishments in Ireland